Glossodoris xishaensis is a species of sea slug, a dorid nudibranch, a marine gastropod mollusc in the family Chromodorididae.

Distribution
This species was described from the Xisha Islands, China.

References

Chromodorididae
Gastropods described in 1975